Ayranlı is an unpopulated village in the Şemdinli District in Hakkâri Province in Turkey, on the border with Iraq. The village had a population of 0 in 2021 but was previously populated by Kurds of the Herkî tribe. The hamlet of Üzümkıran is attached to the village.

History 
The village had a population of 794 in 1967 but was evacuated and burned in 1993 by the state, during to the Kurdish–Turkish conflict. Destroyed homes were remade into five police stations and the local population were still prevented from returning to the village as of 2022.

References 

Villages in Şemdinli District
Kurdish settlements in Hakkâri Province
Unpopulated villages in Turkey